Sabya is a city and sub-division in Jazan Province, in southwestern Saudi Arabia.

References

Populated places in Jizan Province